The Calgary Open was a golf tournament on the Canadian Tour that was held at Heritage Pointe Golf Club in Heritage Pointe near Calgary, Alberta, Canada. It was founded in 1997, and was the first time the tour had based an event in the Calgary area. Telus was the tournament's main sponsor and as such it was titled as the Telus Calgary Open. It ran for four years through 2000, when Telus sought to more evenly distribute their sponsorship of tour events across the season.

Winners

References

Former PGA Tour Canada events
Golf tournaments in Alberta
Recurring sporting events established in 1997
Recurring sporting events disestablished in 2000